Johannes Vollevens II (1685, in The Hague – 1759, in The Hague), was an 18th-century portrait painter from the Northern Netherlands.

Biography
According to Houbraken he learned to paint from his father, Johannes Vollevens. According to the RKD, in 1713 he became a member, and in 1748, he became deacon of the Confrerie Pictura. His selfportrait from 1754 is still in their collection (today the Koninklijke Academie van Beeldende Kunsten KABK). His pupils were Arent Schaasberg and Adriana Verbruggen.

References

1710 painting by Johannes Vollevens II on Artnet

1685 births
1759 deaths
18th-century Dutch painters
18th-century Dutch male artists
Dutch male painters
Artists from The Hague
Painters from The Hague